The King of Fighters '99: Millennium Battle (KOF '99) is a 1999 fighting game developed and published by SNK for the Neo Geo arcade and home consoles in 1999. It is the sixth installment in The King of Fighters series, introducing a new story arc known as the "NESTS Chronicles" which is centered around a young man named K', who is formerly associated with a mysterious yet threatening organization known only as NESTS. The game introduces several changes to the established KOF format, most notably an assisting character labeled "Striker". The game was ported to the Neo-Geo CD and the PlayStation. Dreamcast and Microsoft Windows versions were also released under the title  whose stages were remodeled in 3D.

SNK had originally planned to remove main characters Kyo Kusanagi and Iori Yagami, who had previously appeared in earlier installments of the series, from The King of Fighters '99, but they ended up as hidden characters instead. The popularity of Kyo's previous incarnations resulted in him being given "clones" that wear his original clothes and perform his moves. SNK had difficulty balancing the age of the characters and teams. The Neo Geo and Dreamcast versions are both included in The Kings of Fighters NESTS Hen compilation released for the PlayStation 2 in Japan as well as other ports.

Critical response to The King of Fighters '99 has generally been positive because of its fighting system and its use of Strikers. The Dreamcast port of the game has had a more favorable reception than the PlayStation version thanks to its loading times and graphics. The Nintendo Switch port has garnered a similar response, with reviewers finding it modern and praising its gameplay. While the game has sold well, overall sales have been less than those of the series' previous game because of poor sales of the console versions.

Gameplay

Instead of the three-character teams from earlier The King of Fighters (KOF) games, each team now has four members. Before a match, the player chooses three of the characters to use in the fights. The fourth member becomes the Striker the player summons during battle to help their character by performing one of their Special Moves against the opponent. A Striker can be summoned only a limited number of times during a single match. This is determined by the number of "Strike Bombs" at the bottom of the screen.

The selectable fighting styles, Advanced and Extra, from The King of Fighters '98 have been removed. Instead, the game has a single playing style modeled after the Advanced mode from the previous game, where the player fills their power gauge by attacking the opponent or performing special moves. This time, there are two powered-up states the player can choose during battle depending on the button combination used. Counter Mode increases the player's offensive strength and allows them unlimited use of their character's Super Special Move. There is also a combo that transitions from a Special Move into a Super Special Move by using a "Super Cancellation Attack" or a "Moving Attack". The other powered-up mode is Armor Mode, which increases the character's defensive strength, allowing them to take more damage from the opponent; however, the player cannot use Super Special Moves in Armor Mode.

Depending on the player's performance, a score is given when the fight is finished. Should a high score be reached, the arcade mode will offer the player an extra fight following the final boss.

The updated The King of Fighters '99: Evolution version features stages remodeled in 3D and includes two additional stages, as well as new characters who can only be used as Strikers. The new Strikers are Kyo Kusanagi (in a different outfit), Athena Asamiya (in her school outfit), Goro Daimon, Billy Kane, Ryuji Yamazaki, Chizuru Kagura, Syo Kirishima, Alfred Airhawk, Vanessa, Seth, Fiolina Germi, and Gai Tendo. Also, the game can be connected to the Neo Geo Pocket Color game The King of Fighters: Battle de Paradise. Points won in Battle de Paradise can be transferred to The King of Fighters '99: Evolution to speed up the leveling process for the Extra Strikers.

Plot and characters

Two years have passed since the last King of Fighters tournament. Nobody has seen Kyo Kusanagi or Iori Yagami since they defeated the evil being Orochi at the climax of the 1997 tournament. Invitations are sent to many characters inviting them to a new tournament, which this time around is more of a secretive affair and away from the public eye than the ones in both '96 and '97, with each team now having an additional member. However, the tournament's host remains unknown.

The increased number of characters per team, and the story element of the missing Kyo and Iori, lead to a reshuffling of the character roster. K' is introduced as the game's new protagonist with his partner, Maxima, who joins forces with Kyo's former teammates Benimaru Nikaido and Shingo Yabuki to form the new Hero Team. Takuma Sakazaki rejoins the Art of Fighting Team as its fourth member. Mai Shiranui finally becomes an official member of the Fatal Fury Team for the first time in the series. King joins forces with Blue Mary (formerly a member of the "'97 Special Team") to form the new Women Fighters Team with Kasumi Todoh (last seen in KOF '96) and Li Xiangfei (from Real Bout Fatal Fury 2: The Newcomers). The three returning teams also gain a new member: Whip for the Ikari Warriors Team, Bao for the Psycho Soldier Team, and Jhun Hoon for the Korea Justice Team. The game also introduces two clones of Kyo Kusanagi, Kyo-1 and Kyo-2, as Team Edit characters based on previous playable incarnations of the character. The real Kyo also returns with his rival, Iori, but they are only secret playable characters.

The game's antagonist is Krizalid, an agent from the mysterious organization NESTS who uses the data he obtained from his enemies to activate an army of Kyo clones that NESTS themselves had created after the fight against Orochi. He is faced in two states: first he appears with a special coat that analyzes an opponent's data. Once he's defeated, he burns away his coat and increases his strength while having stronger moves. After Krizalid's defeat, his superior kills him via falling debris while other members of NESTS attack K' and Maxima, who are revealed to be former NESTS agents and that the duo succeed in defeating their enemies before making their escape from the collapsing location of their battle against Krizalid. It's also revealed that K' is a test subject designed to replicate Kyo's techniques.

K’ Team (Hero Team)
K' (New Character)
Maxima (New Character)
Benimaru Nikaido 
Shingo Yabuki
Fatal Fury Team
Terry Bogard
Andy Bogard
Joe Higashi
Mai Shiranui

Art of Fighting Team 
Ryo Sakazaki
Robert Garcia
Yuri Sakazaki
Takuma Sakazaki
Ikari Warriors Team
Leona Heidern
Ralf Jones
Clark Still
Whip (New Character)

Psycho Soldier Team
Athena Asamiya
Sie Kensou
Chin Gentsai
Bao (New Character)
Women Fighters Team
King
Blue Mary
Kasumi Todoh
Li Xiangfei (New Character)
Korea Justice Team
Kim Kaphwan
Chang Koehan
Choi Bounge
Jhun Hoon (New Character)

Single Entry
Kyo-1 (New Character)
Kyo-2 (New Character)
Hidden Characters
Kyo Kusanagi
Iori Yagami
Boss
Krizalid (New Character)

Development
With the introduction of a new lead character, K', SNK had originally planned to remove main characters Kyo Kusanagi and Iori Yagami, who had previously appeared in earlier installments of the series, from The King of Fighters '99. Instead, they ended up as unlockable hidden characters after fans responded negatively to their removal at location tests. Kyo was redesigned for this game, but the developers still liked his school uniform. As a result, based on the practice of adding earlier versions of various characters to games, the staff created the Kyo clones that featured him with classic movesets: Kyo-1 uses Kyo's movesets from the first two games, while Kyo-2 uses his movesets from KOF '96 and KOF '97. To contrast with the previous series' protagonist, Kyo, K' was designed to be the "dark hero". The staff wanted to create a Robo Army Team. This idea was abandoned, but they later created a tribute to it in The King of Fighters 2000 by introducing Rocky, a character from Robo Army, as a Striker for Maxima. The character Whip was originally meant to appear in KOF '96, but due to Leona Heidern's introduction in that game, the staff decided to wait until KOF '99.

Like the earlier games the artwork was done by Shinkiro. The large number of young characters appearing in the game represented a problem for the developers; as a result, the staff introduced older characters such as Seth and Vanessa (who appeared only in the Dreamcast version as Strikers and would not officially debut until the following game) to balance the game. Bao was added to reduce the average age of the Psycho Soldiers Team from 42 to 34. The boss character, Krizalid, was designed "with a straight, stylish appearance and earnest strength"; however, the designer in charge mentioned he "overdid it". Due to the large number of unused graphics accumulated on the Neo Geo version, some of Krizalid's graphics were removed. With the release of the Dreamcast port, the staff could add Krizalid's graphics because of the console's capacity. Vanessa was meant to be a playable character, but due to time constraints, she was only a Striker in the Dreamcast port.

Release
KOF '99 was originally released for the Neo Geo arcade on July 22, 1999. A port to the Neo Geo and Neo-Geo CD consoles was released on September 23, 1999, and December 2, 1999, respectively. The PlayStation port was published on March 23, 2000, in Japan, and on April 22, 2001, in North America. In Japan, it was later republished for the PlayStation SNK Best Collection on March 29, 2001, and once again on July 25, 2002. The North American port was the subject of censorship and blood was omitted. Whip's firearm is edited out of the game's American arcade release, but is uncensored in home release versions. After being released on Wii Virtual Console between 2012 and 2013, the game was released as a part of the ACA Neo Geo range on the Nintendo Switch eShop on May 25, 2017, adding an online mode.

The game was remade for the Dreamcast as The King of Fighters '99: Evolution. It was published in Japan on March 30, 2000, and reprinted on October 25, 2001, with the "SNK Best" logo. In North America, Agetec published it on May 10, 2001. In this port, players can change the audio to listen to arranged tracks of the soundtrack. The game was released during the PlayStation 2's launch and the Dreamcast's ending, and it did not achieve very good sales. On its release week, the Dreamcast port sold 41,387 units, later reaching 67,833 in Japan in 2000. The  PlayStation port sold 96,484. Two CD soundtracks and a drama CD were also released.

The Neo Geo and Dreamcast versions are included in the compilation The Kings of Fighters NESTS Hen released for the PlayStation 2 in Japan. The game was also made available for the PlayStation 4 but only in Japan by Hamster Corporation.

Reception and legacy

The King of Fighters '99 was very popular after its release. According to Famitsu, both the AES and Neo Geo CD sold over 14,620 and 18,925 copies in their first week on the market respectively. In GameSpots article "The History of SNK", KOF '99: Evolution was described as one of the best fighting games on the Dreamcast with Garou: Mark of the Wolves. Various video game publications have commented on the game. While the fighting system has been well-received, critics have expressed mixed feelings about the Striker system.

A Gaming Age writer viewed the sequel's changes as a step in the right direction despite finding assisting characters useless. He said that SNK had created proper balances such as making Kyo Kusanagi less overpowered than in previous games. The inclusion of K', the new lead, has been well-received because of his distinct fighting style. IGNs Anthony Chau commented that although  "people are probably tired of 2D fighting games, saying that they all play the same", he found KOF '99: Evolution to be very distinct. He found the new gameplay very entertaining despite knowing that some "KOF purists hate the Striker system". A GameSpot reviewer described the Striker system as "clearly derived from the tag system from Capcom's Marvel fighting games". They complained there were popular characters who only appeared as Strikers, and wished they were fully playable. GamePro criticized the game because the Strikers' new gameplay "simply [does not] fit in the King of Fighters series" and "is more of a novelty than a game mode".

There were mixed responses to the home versions. German magazine Video Games praised the Neo Geo AES version, giving it a score of 80%. There have also been multiple comparisons between the Dreamcast port and the PlayStation port, with the Dreamcast version being regarded as better.  The use of 3D backgrounds in all versions has been praised. A GamePro writer felt that the Neo Geo's quality was not handled well by the PlayStation, resulting in issues with the graphics and long loading times. Nevertheless, he found the additional material to be pleasing for series' fans. Andrew Seyoon Park of GameSpot found the PlayStation port very good considering the console's limitations. Despite this, he complained about the animation and the voices, and found the reduced number of characters from KOF '98 disappointing. He felt that the boss Krizalid is very hard to beat. HardcoreGaming noted that while the Dreamcast port of the game was superior based on its graphics and loading times, the PlayStation version was still worth playing. Both Uvejuegos stated that while the game did not have a major update of its characters, except Kyo Kusanagi's redesign, it still managed to maintain its quality due to its fighting system. The new lead, K', and the final boss, Krizalid, were described as entertaining. Gaming Age felt the graphic update was more noticeable than the Uvejuegos did but was critical of Krizalid. Gaming Age found him so difficult to defeat they characterized the previous bosses— Rugal Bernstein and Orochi—as easy by comparison. GameSpot agreed, feeling that the boss fight removed the entertainment value from the game due to its difficult challenge.

Greg Orlando reviewed the Dreamcast version of the game for Next Generation, rating it two stars out of five, and stated that "This King of Fighters should consider abdicating the throne."

The game's Nintendo Switch port received positive responses with critics saying its gameplay and graphics were ahead of their time. Nintendo Life praised the varied cast and the new gameplay mechanics but did not find it as appealing as its predecessor. GameSpew felt the port's mechanics, and multiple options prevented the game from being dated. The combat was described as fast enough to appeal to gamers. Bonus Stage found the graphics appealing and praised SNK's focus on giving the game a storyline, despite it being an arcade fighting game. In retrospect, 1UP.com said that while players were bothered by Kyo and Iori's exclusion from teams, and by the Striker system, K's inclusion was one of SNK's best decisions due to his fighting style.

The series' writer, Akihiko Ureshino, wrote a novelization of the game titled Beyond the "K". It was released in November 1999 by ASCII. SNK also released a sequel titled The King of Fighters 2000 a year after KOF '99s release for multiple consoles. In the spin-off game The Rhythm of Fighters, Kyo's character theme, "Tears", was used for the game to work as a rhythm game.

Notes

References

External links 
 
 The King of Fighters '99 at GameFAQs
 The King of Fighters '99 at Giant Bomb
 The King of Fighters '99 at Killer List of Videogames
 The King of Fighters '99 at MobyGames
 The King of Fighters: Evolution at MobyGames

1999 video games
2D fighting games
ACA Neo Geo games
Aicom games
Arcade video games
D4 Enterprise games
Dreamcast games
Fighting games
Multiplayer and single-player video games
Neo Geo games
Neo Geo CD games
Nintendo Switch games
PlayStation (console) games
PlayStation 4 games
PlayStation Network games
SNK games
SNK Playmore games
The King of Fighters games
Virtual Console games
Windows games
Video games developed in Japan
Xbox One games
Hamster Corporation games
CyberFront games
Agetec games